The 1954 European Women's Basketball Championship was the 4th regional championship held by FIBA Europe for women. The competition was held in Belgrade, Yugoslavia and took place June 4–13, 1954. The Soviet Union clinched their third consecutive gold medal, with Czechoslovakia and Bulgaria winning silver and bronze, respectively.

Preliminary round
The teams where divided in two groups of three and one group of four. The first two from each group would go to the Final Round that determined the first six places. The remaining teams went to the Classification Round to determine the seventh-to-tenth spots.

Group A

Group B

Group C

Classification round

Final round

External links
 FIBA Archive

1954
1954 in women's basketball
1954 in Yugoslav women's sport
International women's basketball competitions hosted by Yugoslavia
June 1954 sports events in Europe
1950s in Belgrade
International sports competitions in Belgrade
1953–54 in European basketball
1954 in Yugoslav basketball
1954 in Serbia